Goodwin Young (1850 – 9 January 1915) was an Irish first-class cricketer who played for Cambridge University. He appeared in three first-class matches in 1873.

Young was born at Carrigshane, near Midleton, County Cork, Ireland. He was educated at Shrewsbury School and St John's College, Cambridge. While studying at Cambridge he was admitted to the Inner Temple and after graduating he was called to the bar. He returned to Ireland and was admitted to King's Inns. He died in County Cork.

Notes

1850 births
1915 deaths
Cambridge University cricketers
Irish cricketers
People educated at Shrewsbury School
Alumni of St John's College, Cambridge